3 is the third studio album and by Polish pop band Ich Troje, released in 1999.

Track listing

Certifications

References

1999 albums
Ich Troje albums